Getuli Amnaay Bayo (born June 27, 1980) is a Tanzanian marathon runner. He set his personal best time of 2:10:45, by finishing third at the 2005 Zurich Marathon. He is also the brother of Zebedayo Bayo, who competed for the same event at the 2000 Summer Olympics in Sydney, and at the 2004 Summer Olympics in Athens.

At age twenty-eight, Bayo made his official debut for the 2008 Summer Olympics in Beijing, where he competed in the men's marathon, along with his compatriot Samson Ramadhani. He did not finish the entire race, before reaching the halfway mark of the course.

References

External links

NBC Olympics Profile

Tanzanian male marathon runners
Living people
Olympic athletes of Tanzania
Athletes (track and field) at the 2008 Summer Olympics
1980 births